Funk of Ages is a solo album by former Parliament-Funkadelic keyboardist Bernie Worrell. The album was released in 1990 by Gramavision Records. It includes contributions by numerous guest musicians, including Sly and Robbie, David Byrne, Herbie Hancock, Keith Richards, Vernon Reid, and Phoebe Snow. P-Funk bandmates Bootsy Collins, Maceo Parker, Gary Cooper, Doug Duffey, and Michael Hampton also contributed.

"Outer Spaceways" was written by Sun Ra. "Volunteered Slavery" was written by Rahsaan Roland Kirk.

Critical reception

Patricia Smith, of The Boston Globe, listed Funk of Ages as the best album of 1990. The Chicago Tribune wrote that "Worrell's surprisingly supple voice shines on a couple of melodic reggae numbers, 'Real Life Dreams' and 'Sing'." The Toronto Star determined that "the musicianship is adventurous enough to make for a funky, wide-ranging diversion."

Track listing

"Sing" (Worrell, Michael Hampton, David Byrne)  4:34
"B.W. Jam" (Worrell, Gary Cooper, Joe Polanco)  3:30
"Funk-A-Hall-Licks" (Worrell, Bootsy Collins, Cooper, Doug Duffey)  5:20
"Ain't She Sweet" (Jack Yellen, Milton Ager)  5:02
"Y-Spy" (Worrell, Steve Jordan, Charley Drayton)  4:27
"Real Life Dreams" (Worrell, David Nyce)  4:43
"Beware of Dog" (Worrell, Dougie Bowne)  2:37
"Straight Ahead" (Worrell, Sheila Washington, John Denicola, Patty Maloney, Gil Small)  3:59
"Don't Piss Me Off" (Worrell, Jerry Harrison, Charlie Midnight)  4:26
"Volunteered Slavery/Bern's Blues/Outer Spaceways" (Rahsaan Roland Kirk/Worrell/Sun Ra)  4:45
"At Mos' Spheres" (Worrell)  3:55
"Real Life Dreams On" (Worrell, David Nyce)  1:39

Personnel

Sing
Synthesizer, Organ, Synth Bass, Lead Vocals: Bernie Worrell
Drums: Steve Ferrone
Guitar: Michael Hampton, Jimmy Ripp
Electric Sitar: Jimmy Ripp
Percussion: Larry Fratangelo
Background Vocals: David Byrne, Gary Cooper, Sheila Washington
B.W. Jam
Clavinet, Synthesizer, Synth Bass, Percussion: Bernie Worrell
Drum Programming, Synth Horns, Samples, Sequencing: Joe Polanco, Gary Cooper
Horns: Uptown Horns
Background Vocals: Bernie Worrell, Gary Cooper, Sheila Washington, Steve Washington, Jenny Douglas-Foote
Funk-A-Hall-Licks
Clavinet, Synthesizer, Organ, Lead Vocals: Bernie Worrell
Bass: Bootsy Collins
Drums: Steve Jordan
Keyboard: Herbie Hancock
Guitar: Keith Richards, Jimmy Ripp, Bootsy Collins
Saxophone: Maceo Parker
Background Vocals: Gary Cooper, Sheila Washington, Jody Bell, Doug Duffey
Ain't She Sweet
Arrangement: Bernie Worrell, Bootsy Collins
Piano, Synth Bass: Bernie Worrell
Bass, Drum Programming: Bootsy Collins
Synthesizer: Bernie Worrell, Herbie Hancock
Percussion: Larry Fratangelo
Banjo: Jimmy Ripp
Vocals: Bernie Worrell, Bootsy Collins, Gary Cooper
Y-Spy
Clavinet, Synthesizer, Organ, Lead Vocals: Bernie Worrell
Drums: Steve Jordan
Bass, Snare, Lap Steel Guitar: Charley Drayton
Guitar: Keith Richards, Steve Jordan
Percussion: Steve Jordan, Charley Drayton
Vocals: Steve Jordan, Gary Cooper, Loren Qualls
Real Life Dreams
Organ, Clavinet, Synthesizer, Lead Vocals: Bernie Worrell
Drums: Sly Dunbar
Bass: Robbie Shakespeare
Guitar: Jimmy Ripp, Steve Jordan
Percussion: Larry Fratangelo, Gary Cooper
Background Vocals: Sheila Washington, Jody Bell
Beware of Dog
Clavinet, Organ, Synthesizer: Bernie Worrell
Guitar: Vernon Reid
Drums: Doug Bowne
Bass: Jimmy Hawkes
Saxophone: Maceo Parker
Straight Ahead
Clavinet, Synthesizer, Synth Bass, Lead Vocals: Bernie Worrell
Drums: Steve Ferrone
Guitar: Jimmy Ripp
Bass: Warren McRae
Background Vocals: Gary Cooper, Sheila Washington, Patty Maloney, 
John Denicola, Michael Camacho, Doug Duffey

Don't Piss Me Off
Synthesizer, Synth Bass, Samples: Bernie Worrell
Lead Vocals: Phoebe Snow, Gary Cooper
Organ: Jerry Harrison
Drums: Dennis Chambers
Volunteered Slavery
Producer: Bill Laswell
Organ, Electric Piano: Bernie Worrell
Vocals: Bernie Worrell, Gary Cooper
Chatan, Conga, Tambourine, Bells: Aïyb Dieng
At Mos' Spheres
Producer: Bill Laswell
Organ: Bernie Worrell
Real Life Dreams On
Organ, Clavinet, Synthesizer: Bernie Worrell
Drums: Sly Dunbar
Bass: Robbie Shakespeare
Guitar: Jimmy Ripp, Steve Jordan
Percussion: Larry Fratangelo, Gary Cooper

References 

Bernie Worrell albums
1990 albums
Gramavision Records albums
Albums produced by Bill Laswell